Sönmez Köksal (born 8 March 1940) is a career Turkish civil servant. He served in a variety of positions largely in the Ministry of Foreign Affairs and in international organisations representing Turkey, and was Turkey's Ambassador to Iraq (1986–1990). He was head of the National Intelligence Organization (MİT) from 1992 to 1998, and subsequently Turkey's Ambassador to France (1998–2002). Köksal was the first civilian head of the MIT, breaking the tradition of appointing generals.

References 

1940 births
Living people
People of the National Intelligence Organization (Turkey)
Directors of intelligence agencies
Ambassadors of Turkey to France
Ambassadors of Turkey to Iraq